Larry Dewayne Hall (born December 11, 1962) is an American murderer, rapist and serial killer who stalked and murdered numerous girls and women between 1981 and 1994. A fan of the American Revolution and Civil War, Hall traveled around the Midwest for historical reenactments where he would often abduct, rape, torture, and murder girls and women, typically teenagers or young adults, but sometimes preteens or middle-aged. He came under police attention after the discovery of a 15-year-old's remains in November 1993, and was convicted of her kidnapping. He later confessed to that and an additional murder, though recanted his confessions of both crimes. 

Since his arrest, Hall has confessed to more than 35 murders, recanting them all, though authorities believe he could be responsible for the deaths and disappearances of 40–50 young women, which would place him amongst the most prolific serial killers in American history.

Early life
Hall was born as a twin in Wabash, Indiana in December 1962. He spent his first few days in a neonatal intensive care unit due to lack of oxygen after his brother Gary "fed on him in the womb" in a monochorionic pregnancy. Larry grew up digging graves with his sexton father, and was antisocial in school, where he struggled due to his low IQ.

He was suspected of committing various acts of arson, burglary, and other petty crimes in his teens. After high school, Hall got a job as a janitor, and began traveling around the state to take part in historical reenactments.

Murders 
On July 20, 1993, 15-year-old Jessica Roach went missing from her hometown of Georgetown, Illinois. Two months later, her remains were found in a cornfield. After a witness said they saw a man driving a van around the cornfield, in early 1994 several other people called the police about a man driving a van and talking to young girls, which led to Hall being brought in for questioning in October. Authorities showed Hall a photo of Roach and he "immediately flinched," leading them to suspect he had been involved in her murder, though he denied having ever seen her.

After finding evidence in his Dodge 1982 van connecting him to Roach's disappearance and after Hall gave details that only the perpetrator of the crime could have known, Hall eventually confessed to and was charged with Roach's abduction, though not her murder, that December. He was found guilty in June 1995. At the time, the FBI assumed he had murdered both Roach and college student Tricia Reitler, which Hall had confessed to but recanted.

It is believed that Hall's first murder occurred when he was 18. 15-year-old Dean Marie Pyle Peters disappeared from her Grand Rapids, Michigan middle school in February 1981, and her body was never recovered. 12-year-old Debra Jean Cole disappeared from her Indiana hometown in late-August, which Hall is also suspected of. Over the next 13 years, numerous female corpses, some as young as 10 and some unidentified, were discovered and later attributed to Hall due to their bodies being strangled and sexually mutilated. His final assumed-killing took place in early-October 1994, just three weeks before he was brought in by police for questioning. 

Hall frequented historical re-enactment sites and would select victims from nearby towns and cities. He abducted his victims, primarily teenage girls and young women, though some were pre-teens and others were middle-aged, often but not always to rape and/or torture them, and then stab and/or strangle them to death. He usually mutilated their bodies, often sexually. Below is a work-in-progress list of his presumed victims.

Aftermath and incarceration

In 1998, the FBI reached out to a man named James Keene, who was serving a ten-year prison sentence on a drug conspiracy charge. The FBI, having learned of Keene’s affability, charm and charisma, and worrying that Hall could have won his appeal against his conviction for the Roach kidnapping, offered to  totally commute and erase Keene’s sentence if he agreed to be transferred to the same maximum security prison as Hall in order to befriend him and obtain the locations of the bodies of his victims, as well as any additional murders he may have committed. They had suspected that Hall was responsible for more than the two murders they could confirm. Keene agreed and did so. Hall eventually confessed to him that he had killed Reitler. One day Keene saw Hall working on a map of the Midwest with red dots and names over it, which Hall quickly covered up. 

Keene, thinking the map would be enough for the FBI, yelled at Hall, calling him "one of the most despicable forms of human life on this planet." Keene later regretted blowing his cover at that point, wishing he had gotten possession of the map before exposing his true motives. Unable to reach his FBI contacts or prove his true identity, Keene was placed in solitary confinement for two weeks before being released. He tried to recite the map from memory, but was unable to lead to any discoveries. The map was never recovered by authorities. Due to some of the specific details Keene retrieved from Hall that confirmed his knowledge of several disappearances, Hall's eventual appeal was denied and Keene was released from his sentence.

As of 2023, Hall was serving life without the possibility of parole in Federal Correctional Complex in North Carolina. He has since admitted to as many as 39 murders, later recanting every confession. The FBI believes he could have committed up to 50, which would make him one of the most prolific serial killers in American history.

In popular culture  

The 2022 miniseries Black Bird depicts Jimmy Keene and Hall's relationship in prison. Hall is portrayed by Paul Walter Hauser.

References 

1962 births
American male criminals
American people convicted of murder
American murderers of children
American rapists
Living people
People from Wabash, Indiana
Suspected serial killers
Torture in the United States
People convicted under the Federal Kidnapping Act
People convicted of murder by the United States federal government
Prisoners sentenced to life imprisonment by the United States federal government
Crimes against sex workers in the United States